Acacia trulliformis is a shrub of the genus Acacia and the subgenus Plurinerves that is endemic to an area of south western Australia.

Description
Like most species of Acacia it has phyllodes rather than true leaves. It blooms in September and produces yellow flowers.

Taxonomy
It belongs to the Acacia flavipila group and is thought to be closely related to Acacia loxophylla.

Distribution
It is native to an area in the Great Southern region of Western Australia where it is found growing in sandy loam soils. The range of the plant extends from the south east of Ongerup down to around the Gordon Inlet in the south east where it is commonly situated on creek flats as a part of Eucalyptus occidentalis woodland communities.

See also
 List of Acacia species

References

trulliformis
Acacias of Western Australia
Taxa named by Bruce Maslin
Taxa named by Richard Sumner Cowan
Plants described in 1999